Henderson Point is a census-designated place (CDP) in Harrison County, Mississippi, United States. It is part of the Gulfport–Biloxi Metropolitan Statistical Area. The population was 170 at the 2010 census.

Geography
Henderson Point is located at the end of a peninsula along the edge of the Gulf of Mexico. It is bordered by St. Louis Bay to the west and north, the Gulf of Mexico to the south, and the city of Pass Christian to the east. Henderson Point is the site of the east end of the Bay St. Louis Bridge, which carries U.S. Route 90 across St. Louis Bay to the city of Bay St. Louis in Hancock County.

Demographics

2020 census

As of the 2020 United States census, there were 232 people, 91 households, and 37 families residing in the CDP.

References

Census-designated places in Harrison County, Mississippi
Census-designated places in Mississippi
Gulfport–Biloxi metropolitan area